Nomada panzeri  is a Palearctic species of nomad bee.

References

External links
Images representing  Nomada panzeri 

Hymenoptera of Europe
Nomadinae
Insects described in 1841
Taxa named by Amédée Louis Michel le Peletier